Charney Manor is a 13th-century manor house at Charney Bassett now in the English county of Oxfordshire (but formerly in Berkshire). It is a grade I listed building.

Charney Manor was originally a grange of Abingdon Abbey. It was later rented out to the Yate family. It is currently a Quaker retreat and conference centre.

References

External links
Berkshire History: Charney Manor

Buildings and structures completed in the 13th century
Country houses in Oxfordshire
Grade I listed houses in Oxfordshire